Jenna Mattison, born Jenna Mattison Mirza (born August 7, 1976) is an American actress, screenwriter, producer, and director.

Early life 
Mattison was born in India, with her family moving to Chicago when she was 7 years old. From an early age, she became self conscious about her ethnicity, growing up in a mostly white neighborhood. She cited her name as one of the reasons she struggled to land acting roles in her early career, and opted to change her stage name to Jenna Mattison.

Early career 
Mattison moved to Hollywood in the late 90's, and would her dye her hair while avoiding any sort of natural tan in order to look white-passing. Some of Mattison's early roles included bit parts in Married... with Children, Party of Five and Melrose Place.

While working at The Laugh Factory as a cocktail waitress, Mattison began working on a screenplay, which she viewed catharsis while dealing with an unhappy relationship at the time. After a chance encounter with a Hollywood producer, Mattison's script was greenlit, and the romantic comedy Fish Without a Bicycle was released and published as her first independent film, with Mattison as the lead writer, co-producer, and star of the film. Fish Without a Bicycle premiered at the 2003 Cannes Film Festival.

Career 
Mattison made her directorial debut with the psychological horror film, The Sound, released by MGM Orion and Samuel Goldwyn in 2017. Critics noted lead Rose McGowan's performance, as well as Mattison's focus on atmospheric direction.

In 2021, Mattison was attached as a screenwriter for a film adaptation of Sophie Kinsella's novel Remember Me?

Filmography

Actress

Producer

Writer

Director

Personal life 
Mattison married actor Richard Gunn in 2013. The two currently live in Los Angeles, California.

References

External links

Jenna Mattison Blog
EXCLUSIVE: Rose McGowan Teases the Most 'Intense' Scenes From Creepy New Thriller, 'The Sound'
Review: Rose McGowan shines in the atmospheric horror film 'The Sound'
 Rose McGowan investigates the paranormal in spooky 'The Sound' exclusive clip
 Orion Pictures, Samuel Goldwyn Films board 'The Sound'
 Review - Rose McGowan is Brilliant in The Sound
 Jenna Mattison - Rotten Tomatoes
Review - Rose McGowan is Brilliant in The Sound
Rose McGowan investigates the paranormal in spooky 'The Sound' exclusive clip
EXCLUSIVE: Rose McGowan Teases the Most 'Intense' Scenes From Creepy New Thriller, 'The Sound'
Orion Pictures, Samuel Goldwyn Films board 'The Sound'
 https://www.hngn.com/articles/143741/20151025/richard-gunn-hemlock-grove-christopher-lloyd-longer-run-dark-angel-netflix-exclusive-interview.htm

American film actresses
American film producers
American women screenwriters
Place of birth missing (living people)
American screenwriters
American television actresses
Living people
American women film producers
21st-century American women
1976 births